Katroso is a rural locality (a selo) in Chadakolobsky Selsoviet, Tlyaratinsky District, Republic of Dagestan, Russia. The population was 83 as of 2010.

Geography 
Katroso is located 19 km north of Tlyarata (the district's administrative centre) by road. Chadakolob is the nearest rural locality.

References 

Rural localities in Tlyaratinsky District